Guimba the Tyrant is a 1995 Malian comedy drama film in the Bambara language (with some Fula language components), directed by noted Malian director Cheick Oumar Sissoko. The movie shows the rise and fall of a cruel and despotic village chief Guimba, and his son Jangine in a fictional village in the Sahel of Mali. Some of the storytelling is done through the village griot, and with the film being placed in an old setting, this lends an epic touch to the movie. The exact chronological setting of the movie is difficult to ascertain, since it is set in an isolated village, but the commonly used weaponry shown is the blunderbuss. However, one scene outside the village features a neem tree, a species introduced to Africa in the colonial period. The film has some magical components, including a solar eclipse brought on by magic. Casting was only partially done from among professional actors.

The film has well designed, colorful and exotic props, costumes and sets. It has evoked mixed responses from critics, and been lauded for its visual beauty. Slapstick comedy is present throughout the movie, as is comedy through the actions of the griot. The screenplay also contains numerous interesting African adages. The movie soundtrack contains music sung in old dialects using ancient instruments.

Some critics have founds elements of political satire in the film, due to director Oumar Sissoko's resistance to Malian dictator Moussa Traoré.

Plot

The film opens with a village griot reciting the story of Guimba the tyrant, of the Dunbuya family. The setting moves to an old Malian village ruled by the evil and tyrannical leader Guimba and his dwarf son Janguine. Janguine has been betrothed from childhood to the village beauty Kani from the Diarra family - the other powerful family in the village. Janguine, however, has his eyes on Kani's well-endowed mother Meya, and hence Guimba offers to marry Kani, asking Kani's father for a divorce so that Janguine can marry Meya. When he refuses, he is banished from the village. Protests break out, leading to the killings, and subjugation.

As the village gets embroiled in a civil war, Kani manages to escape to her father's camp on horseback with Guimba unsuccessfully giving chase. Guimba's slave is also welcomed into the rebel camp. She is dressed up provocatively and sent back to the village, causing both Guimba and Janguine to fall for her. Guimba kills his son over her, and chases her out of the village and into a trap - leading to his downfall.

Awards

 Grand prize, FESPACO (Pan African Film Festival of Ouagadougou) - 1995

Reviews

External links
 Guimba the Tyrant distributed by California Newsreel

1995 films
Malian comedy films
French comedy-drama films
German comedy-drama films
Bambara-language films
Fula-language films
1995 comedy-drama films
Films set in Mali
African fantasy films
Films set in pre-colonial sub-Saharan Africa
Malian drama films
1990s French films
1990s German films